The 1997 World Table Tennis Championships men's singles was the 44th edition of the men's singles championship. 

Jan-Ove Waldner defeated Vladimir Samsonov in the final, winning three sets to nil to secure the title.

Results

See also
List of World Table Tennis Championships medalists

References

-